"Under Age's Song" is the second maxi single by Japanese group Dragon Ash, released in 1998.

Track listing
"Under Age's Song" – 6:00
"Face to Face" – 5:06
"Mustang a Go Go !!!" – 4:35

1998 singles
Dragon Ash songs
1998 songs